The Batahin are an Arab tribe in Butana, a region in Sudan. The Batahin are a tribe within the larger Ja'alin tribe confederation.  The Batahin are Arabic-speaking Muslims, and number about 200,000.

The population of Batahin sits in total around 286,000.

References

Ethnic groups in Sudan